Tim Miller (born March 6, 1987) is an American-German professional ice hockey forward who is currently playing for Heilbronner Falken in the DEL2.

Playing career
In the 2013–14 season, Miller endured a journeyman season. After 4 games with the Wolves he was moved and appeared in 21 games with the Springfield Falcons, posting 1 goal and 9 assists before he was traded to fellow AHL club, the San Antonio Rampage, in exchange for Denny Urban on February 20, 2014. Miller went scoreless in 3 games with the Rampage before he moved to the Abbotsford Heat for the remainder of the season.

A free agent into the following 2014–15 season, Miller signed his first contract abroad on a two-year contract with German club, the Fischtown Pinguins of the DEL2 on November 10, 2014. When his contract was up, he moved to the Straubing Tigers of the German top-tier Deutsche Eishockey Liga (DEL), signing in May 2016. In late October 2017, he inked a deal with German DEL2 side Dresdner Eislöwen before moving to Krefeld Pinguine of the DEL on November 10, 2017.

Career statistics

Awards and honours

References

External links

1987 births
Living people
Abbotsford Heat players
American men's ice hockey forwards
Chicago Wolves players
Dresdner Eislöwen players
Evansville IceMen players
Fischtown Pinguins players
Gwinnett Gladiators players
Heilbronner Falken players
Ice hockey players from Michigan
Krefeld Pinguine players
Michigan Wolverines men's ice hockey players
Omaha Lancers players
River City Lancers players
San Antonio Rampage players
Springfield Falcons players
Straubing Tigers players
Syracuse Crunch players